Thomas Ingoldsby (3 March 1689 – 1768), of Waldridge, near Aylesbury, Buckinghamshire, was an English politician who sat in the House of Commons from 1730 to 1734.

Ingoldsby was the eldest surviving son of Richard Ingoldsby of Waldridge and his wife Mary Colmore, daughter of William Colmore of Warwick. In 1703 he succeeded his father. He was probably educated at Winchester College in 1704 and matriculated at St John's College, Oxford on 19 September 1706, aged 16.  He married Anne Limbrey, daughter of John Limbrey of Tangier Park, Hampshire.

Ingoldsby was elected Member of Parliament (MP)  for Aylesbury at a contested by-election on 13 February 1730, when he defeated the sitting Member who was a follower of Walpole. He voted with the Government on the Excise Bill of 1733 and on the repeal of the Septennial Act 1734. In 1733, he was  recorded as supporting administration candidates in Buckinghamshire for the 1734 general election, but did not stand himself.

Ingoldsby died  in late 1768. He had one surviving daughter.

References

1689 births
1768 deaths
People from Aylesbury Vale
British MPs 1727–1734
Members of the Parliament of Great Britain for English constituencies